A with acute (А́ а́; italics: А́ а́) is a letter of the Cyrillic script. In all its forms it looks exactly like the Latin letter A with acute (Á á Á á).

Usage 
 and many other stressed variations of normal vowels can be found in East Slavic languages as stressed variants of regular (unaccented) vowels, like in Russian за́мок ('castle').

Stress marks are optional and are used consistently only in special books like dictionaries, primers, or textbooks for foreigners, as stress is very unpredictable in all three languages. However, in general texts, stress marks are rarely used, mainly to prevent ambiguity or to show the pronunciation of foreign words.

In these languages, they have huge amount of words and letters like these are important in these languages, mostly for the Russian language. So that people to understand properly and is necessary to know the place of the stress in these words.

Related letters and other similar characters
A a : Latin letter A
Á á : Latin letter Á - a Czech, Faroese, Hungarian, Icelandic, and Slovak letter
А а : Cyrillic letter А
Cyrillic characters in Unicode

Computing codes
Being a relatively recent letter, not present in any legacy 8-bit Cyrillic encoding, the letter А́ is not represented directly by a precomposed character in Unicode either; it has to be composed as А+◌́ (U+0301).

References

Letters with acute
Cyrillic letters with diacritics